The 1975–76 ABA season was the ninth and final season of the American Basketball Association. The shot clock was changed from 30 to 24 seconds to match the NBA. Dave DeBusschere was the league's new commissioner, its seventh and last. This was also the only season that did not use the East-West division setup. The NBA would adopt the ABA's three-point shot for the 1979–80 season.

Prior to the start of the season, the Memphis Sounds relocated to Baltimore, Maryland, and briefly became the Baltimore Hustlers, then the Baltimore Claws. The Claws folded during the preseason in October after playing three exhibition games. The San Diego Conquistadors were replaced for the 1975–76 season by the San Diego Sails, but folded in November, followed by the Utah Stars in early December. The Virginia Squires folded in May following the end of the season, unable to make a $75,000 league assessment.

The 1976 ABA All-Star Game saw the first place Denver Nuggets come from behind to defeat the ABA All Stars 144-138 in Denver.  The game saw the first ever Slam Dunk Contest, won by Julius Erving.

With the conclusion of the season, the June 1976 ABA-NBA merger saw the Denver Nuggets, Indiana Pacers, New York Nets, and San Antonio Spurs join the NBA, while the Kentucky Colonels and Spirits of St. Louis accepted deals to fold.  The deal accepted by the Spirits' owners, Ozzie and Daniel Silna, would turn out to be quite lucrative, as they agreed to receive a seventh of the television revenue generated by each of the four newly-added franchises in perpetuity.

Season standings

Asterisk (*) denotes playoff team

Bold - ABA Champions

Playoffs

The 1976 ABA Playoffs opened with the Kentucky Colonels defeating the Indiana Pacers 2 games to 1 in the quarterfinals.  The Colonels then lost a seven-game semifinal series to the #1 seeded Denver Nuggets, 4 games to 3.  The other semifinal saw the New York Nets outlast the San Antonio Spurs 4 games to 3.  In the finals the Nets beat the Nuggets, 4 games to 2.

Awards and honors

 ABA Most Valuable Player Award: Julius Erving, New York Nets (3rd selection)
 Rookie of the Year: David Thompson, Denver Nuggets
 Coach of the Year: Larry Brown, Denver Nuggets (3rd selection)
 Playoffs MVP: Julius Erving, New York Nets (2nd selection)
 All-Star Game MVP: David Thompson, Denver Nuggets
 Executive of the Year: Carl Scheer, Denver Nuggets (3rd selection)
All-ABA First Team 
 Julius Erving, New York Nets (4th First Team selection, 5th overall selection)
 Billy Knight, Indiana Pacers 
 Artis Gilmore, Kentucky Colonels (5th selection)
 James Silas, San Antonio Spurs (1st First Team selection, 2nd overall selection)
 Ralph Simpson, Denver Nuggets (1st First Team selection, 3rd overall selection)
All-ABA Second Team
 David Thompson, Denver Nuggets
 Bobby Jones, Denver Nuggets
 Dan Issel, Denver Nuggets (4th Second Team selection, 5th overall selection)
 Don Buse, Indiana Pacers
 George Gervin, San Antonio Spurs (2nd selection)
All-Defensive Team
Don Buse (2nd selection), Indiana Pacers
Julius Erving, New York Nets
Artis Gilmore (4th selection), Kentucky Colonels
Bobby Jones (2nd selection), Denver Nuggets
Brian Taylor (2nd selection), New York Nets
All-Rookie Team
 Luther Burden, Virginia Squires
 M. L. Carr, Spirits of St. Louis
 Kim Hughes, New York Nets
 Mark Olberding, San Diego Sails & San Antonio Spurs 
 David Thompson, Denver Nuggets

References

 
ABA season
American Basketball Association seasons